Fevergreens is an album by the Norwegian composer and artist Jono El Grande, released 2003.

Track listing

 "Prologue"
 "Awake, Wonderful and Lavish"
 "I'm Not a Star I'm Just Lost in Space"
 "Good Gracious"
 "Cuban Serum"
 "Rumba for a Slightly Excited Ape"
 "Cha!"
 "The Frenzied Butterflies"
 "Centrifuge in d minor"
 "Tango on the Crest of Reality"
 "Ante's Inferno"
 "Ariaph Orahri"
 "Isle of View"
 "Epilogue - Encore"

2003 albums
Jono El Grande albums